The 1998–99 UNC Charlotte 49ers men's basketball team represented the University of North Carolina at Charlotte in the 1998–99 college basketball season. This was head coach Bobby Lutz's first season at the school. The 49ers competed in Conference USA and played their home games at Dale F. Halton Arena. They finished the season 23–11 (10–6 in C-USA play) and received an at-large bid to the 1999 NCAA tournament as No. 5 seed in the Midwest region. The 49ers defeated No. 12 seed  in the opening round before losing to No. 13 seed Oklahoma, 85–72, in the round of 32.

Roster

Schedule and results

|-
!colspan=9 style=| Regular season

|-
!colspan=9 style=| C-USA tournament

|-
!colspan=9 style=| NCAA tournament

Rankings

References

Charlotte 49ers men's basketball seasons
UNC Charlotte
UNC Charlotte
UNC Charlotte 49ers men's basket
UNC Charlotte 49ers men's basket